Epirus (Epirote Greek: , ; Attic Greek:) was an ancient Greek kingdom, and later republic, located in the geographical region of Epirus, in parts of north-western Greece and southern Albania. Home to the ancient Epirotes, the state was bordered by the Aetolian League to the south, Ancient Thessaly and Ancient Macedonia to the east, and Illyrian tribes to the north. The Greek king Pyrrhus is known to have made Epirus a powerful state in the Greek realm (during 280–275 BC) that was comparable to the likes of Ancient Macedonia and Ancient Rome. Pyrrhus' armies also attempted an assault against the state of Ancient Rome during their unsuccessful campaign in what is now modern-day Italy.

History

Prehistory
Epirus has been occupied since at least Neolithic times by seafarers (along the coast) and by hunters and shepherds (in the interior) who brought with them the Greek language. These neolithic peoples buried their leaders in large tumuli (mounds of earth that were raised over a grave) containing shaft tombs similar to those made by Mycenaean peoples. Due to these ritualistic similarities, an ancestral link may exist between the Epirotes and the Mycenaeans. A number of Mycenaean remains have also been found in Epirus at the most important ancient religious sites in the region, including at the Necromanteion of Acheron (on the Acheron river) and at the Oracle of Zeus at Dodona. It is also known that Epirus had strong contact with other Ancient Greek regions, including those of Macedonia, Thessaly, Aetolia and Acarnania.

The Dorians invaded Greece from Epirus and Macedonia at the end of the 2nd millennium BC (circa 1100–1000 BC), though the reasons for their migration are obscure. The region's original inhabitants were driven southward into the Greek mainland by the invasion and by the early 1st millennium BC three principal clusters of Greek-speaking tribes emerged in Epirus. These were the Chaonians of northwestern Epirus, the Molossians in the center, and the Thesprotians in the south. The region inhabited by each of these ethne had its own name (Chaonia, Molossia, Thesprotia), thus there was no single name for the entire region originally.

The Greek toponym Epirus, meaning "mainland" or "continent", first appears in the work of Hecataeus of Miletus in the 6th century BC and is one of the few Greek names from the view of an external observer with a maritime-geographical perspective. Although not originally a native Epirote name, it later came to be adopted by the inhabitants of the area.

Molossian expansion (470–330 BC)
The Molossian Aeacidae dynasty managed to create the first centralized state in Epirus from about 370 BC onwards, expanding their power at the expense of rival tribes. The Aeacids allied themselves with the increasingly powerful kingdom of Macedon, in part against the common threat of Illyrian raids, and in 359 BC the Molossian princess Olympias, niece of Arybbas of Epirus, married King Philip II of Macedon (r. 359–336 BC). She was to become the mother of Alexander the Great. On the death of Arybbas, Alexander the Molossian, uncle of Alexander the Great of Macedon, succeeded to the throne with the title King of Epirus.

In 334 BC, the time Alexander the Great crossed into Asia, Alexander I the Molossian led an expedition in southern Italy in support of the Greek cities of Magna Graecia against the nearby Italian tribes and the emerging Roman Republic. After some successes on the battlefield, he was defeated by a coalition of Italic tribes at the Battle of Pandosia in 331 BC.

Kingdom of Epirus (330–231 BC)

In 330 BC, upon Alexander the Molossian's death, the term "Epirus" appears as a single political unit in the ancient Greek records for the first time, under the leadership of the Molossian dynasty. Subsequently, the coinages of the three major Epirote tribal groups came to an end, and a new coinage was issued with the legend Epirotes. After Alexander's I death, Aeacides of Epirus, who succeeded him, espoused the cause of Olympias against Cassander, but was dethroned in 313 BC.

Aeacides's son Pyrrhus came to the throne in 295 BC. Pyrrhus, being a skillful general, was encouraged to aid the Greeks of Tarentum and decided to initiate a major offensive in the Italian peninsula and Sicily. Due to its superior martial abilities, the Epirote army defeated the Romans in the Battle of Heraclea (280 BC). Subsequently, Pyrrhus's forces nearly reached the outskirts of Rome, but had to retreat to avoid an unequal conflict with a more numerous Roman army. The following year, Pyrrhus invaded Apulia (279 BC) and the two armies met in the Battle of Asculum where the Epirotes won the eponymous Pyrrhic victory, at a high cost.

In 277 BC, Pyrrhus captured the Carthaginian fortress in Eryx, Sicily. This prompted the rest of the Carthaginian-controlled cities to defect to Pyrrhus. Meanwhile, he had begun to display despotic behavior towards the Sicilian Greeks and soon Sicilian opinion became inflamed against him. Though he defeated the Carthaginians in battle, he was forced to abandon Sicily.

Pyrrhus's Italian campaign came to an end following the inconclusive Battle of Beneventum (275 BC). Having lost the vast majority of his army, he decided to return to Epirus, which finally resulted in the loss of all his Italian holdings. Because of his costly victories, the term "Pyrrhic victory" is often used for a victory with devastating cost to the victor.

Epirote League (231–167 BC)

In 233 BC, the last surviving member of the Aeacid royal house, Deidamia, was murdered. Her death brought the Epirote royal family to an abrupt extinction and a federal republic was set up, though with diminished territory, since western Acarnania had asserted its independence, and the Aetolians seized Ambracia, Amphilochia, and the remaining land north of the Ambracian Gulf. The new Epirote capital was therefore established at Phoenice, the political center of the Chaonians. The reasons for the swift fall of the Aeacid dynasty were probably complex. Aetolian pressure must have played a part, and the alliance with Macedonia may have been unpopular; in addition, there were perhaps social tensions. However, Epirus remained a substantial power, unified under the auspices of the Epirote League as a federal state with its own parliament (or synedrion).

In the following years, Epirus faced the growing threat of the expansionist Roman Republic, which fought a series of wars with Macedonia. The League remained neutral in the first two Macedonian Wars but split in the Third Macedonian War (171–168 BC), with the Molossians siding with the Macedonians and the Chaonians and Thesprotians siding with Rome. The outcome was disastrous for Epirus; Molossia fell to Rome in 167 BC and 150,000 of its inhabitants were enslaved.

Organization

In antiquity, Epirus was settled by the same nomadic Hellenic tribes that went on to settle the rest of Greece. Unlike most other Greeks of the time, who lived in or around city-states such as Athens or Sparta, the Epirotes lived in small villages and their way of life was foreign to that of polis of southern Greeks. Their region lay on the edge of the Greek world and was far from peaceful; for many centuries, it remained a frontier area contested with the Illyrian peoples of the Adriatic coast and interior. However, Epirus had a far greater religious significance than might have been expected given its geographical remoteness, due to the presence of the shrine and oracle at Dodona – regarded as second only to the more famous oracle at Delphi.

Culture
At least since classical antiquity, the Epirotes were speakers of an epichoric Northwest Greek dialect, Epirote Greek, different from the Dorian of the Greek colonies on the Ionian islands, and bearers of mostly Greek names, as evidenced by epigraphy and literary evidence.

Nicholas Hammond argues that the principal social structure of the Epirotes was the tribe and that they spoke a West-Greek dialect. Tom Winnifrith (1983) argues that the Epirotes became culturally more closely connected to the rest of the Greek world during the centuries that preceded the Roman conquest of the region (3rd-2nd century BC), while hellenisation process continued even after the conquest. As such their rulers claimed Greek descent. Old genealogical links through the stories about the return voyages of the Greek heroes from Troy (nostoi) and other Greek myths strongly connected Epirus with the rest of Greece and these stories prevented any serious debate about the Greekness of the Epirotes, including the Molossians. The language they spoke was regarded as a primitive Northwestern Greek dialect, but there was no question that it was Greek. The way of life in Epirus was more archaic than that in the Corinthian and Corcyrean colonies on the coast, but there was never a discussion about their Greekness.

Ancient writers such as Herodotus, Dionysius of Halicarnassus, Pausanias, and Eutropius, describe the Epirotes as Greeks. On the other hand, the 5th century BC Athenian historian Thucydides describes them as "barbarians" in his History of the Peloponnesian War, as does Strabo in his Geography. Simon Hornblower interprets the vague, and sometimes even antithetical, comments of Thucydides on the Epirotes as implying that they were neither completely "barbarian" nor completely Greek, but akin to the latter. Notably, Thucydides had similar views of the neighboring Aetolians and Acarnians, even though the evidence leaves no doubt that they were Greek. The term "barbarian" may have denoted not only clearly non-Greek populations, but also Greek populations on the fringe of the Greek world with peculiar dialects. A far more reliable source on the views of the Greeks is the list of sacred envoys in Epidaurus, which includes the Epirotes. The list which was compiled in 360 BC includes the sacred envoys (members of the ruling family of each tribe or subtribe) of the Molossians, Kassopeans, Chaonians and Thesprotians.

In terms of religion they worshiped the same gods like the rest of the Greeks. No traces of non-Greek deities were found until the Hellenistic age (with the introduction of oriental deities in the Greek world). Their supreme deity was Zeus and the Oracle of Dodona found in the land of the Molossians attracted pilgrims from all over the Greek world. As with the rest of the Epirotes they were included in the thearodokoi catalogues where only Greeks were allowed in order to participated in Panhellenic Games and festivals. Aristotle considered the region around Dodona to have been part of Hellas and the region where the Hellenes originated. Plutarch mentions an interesting cultural element of the Epirotes regarding the Greek hero Achilles. In his biography of King Pyrrhus, he states that Achilles "had a divine status in Epirus and in the local dialect he was called Aspetos" (meaning "unspeakable" or "unspeakably great" in Homeric Greek).

See also
List of cities in ancient Epirus
List of ancient Epirotes

References

Citations

Sources

 
167 BC
2nd-century BC disestablishments
Ancient Epirus
Kingdoms in Greek Antiquity
Hellenistic Greece